SS Thurso was a cargo steamship operated by Ellerman's Wilson Line. Thurso was built in 1919 by S. P. Austin & Sons in Sunderland as the War Bramble for the Shipping Controller. She was sold to Ellerman Lines while still building and remained with them until lost in the Second World War.

Last voyage
Under Master William Waldie, Thurso was part of Convoy HG 84   which had left Lisbon for Liverpool, and called at Gibraltar on 9 June to join with the 36th Escort Group under the command of Captain "Johnnie" Walker.

Thurso carried 850 tons of cork, general cargo, and 1,500 bags of mail for German Prisoners of War in Britain. She had a crew of 36 and six gunners.

At 00.58 and 00.59 hours on 15 June 1942 the U-552, commanded by Kapitänleutnant Erich Topp attacked convoy HG84 sinking three ships, the Etrib, Pelayo and Slemdal.

The convoy was attacked again approximately 300 nautical miles to the west of Cape Finisterre early in the morning of 15 June 1942 by U-552. Following a preliminary skirmish Topp fired three torpedoes at the convoy between 0432 and 0434 hrs.

According to an oral history recounted by Cpt. "Johnnie" Walker, the Thurso was the first to be struck by torpedoes:

From Captain Waldie's report:

Losses
Thirteen of Thursos crew of 42 were lost.  The master, Captain Waldie, 22 crew members and the six gunners survived to be picked up by the corvette HMS Marigold and were landed at Greenock. Those men lost were listed on panels 107–108 of the Tower Hill Memorial that commemorates men and women of the Merchant Navy and Fishing Fleets who died in both World Wars and who have no known grave. It stands on the south side of the garden of Trinity Square, London, close to The Tower of London.

Memorials
A sailor on board an escort ship wrote: 
Admiral Lord Mountevans wrote after the war: 
Historian John Keegan wrote:

References 

World War II shipwrecks in the Atlantic Ocean
Ships sunk by German submarines in World War II
Steamships of the United Kingdom
World War II merchant ships of the United Kingdom
Ships of the Ellerman Lines
1919 ships
Maritime incidents in June 1942